is a 2007 party video game developed by Hudson Soft and published by Nintendo for the Nintendo DS. The second handheld game in the Mario Party series, and the last game to be developed by Hudson Soft, who was replaced by NDcube in 2012. It was also released on the Virtual Console for the Wii U in April 2016. Mario Party DS was followed by Mario Party 9 for the Wii.

Gameplay

As with most Mario Party games, an emphasis is placed on the game's multiplayer aspect. The game uses the Download Play functionality of the Nintendo DS to allow four people to play wirelessly using only one game card. Mario, Luigi, Princess Peach, Yoshi, Princess Daisy, Toad, Wario, and Waluigi are the playable characters.

Mario Party DS features a total of 74 minigames, most of which utilize the unique features of the DS. While several mini-games use the buttons and control pad, others use the stylus and 4 mini-games use the microphone. For example, "Soccer Survival" involves trying to dodge soccer balls being kicked by a Goomba. "Camera Shy" involves characters taking photos of other characters and "Short Fuse" involves blowing on a fuse of a bomb in hopes to be the last player to survive. Others include "Globe Gunners", a game in which the players run around on a globe, shooting projectiles at each other, and boss minigames, in which the player battles villains from the Mario series, such as Bowser and Dry Bones. Minigame types include 4-player free-for-alls, teams of 2, 1 against 3, "battle" (in which players compete for a communal jackpot), and "boss" (in which the player fights 1 of 5 bosses).

Party Mode is the main mode of the game. Players take turns moving around the board, collecting coins and exchanging coins for stars. At the end of the party, the player with the most stars wins; in case of a tie, the number of coins is used to break the tie. 

In "Puzzle Mode", the player plays puzzle games from previous installments of the Mario Party series: "Mario's Puzzle Party" from Mario Party 3, "Bob-omb Breakers" from Mario Party 4, "Piece Out" from Mario Party 5, "Block Star" from Mario Party 6, and "Stick and Spin" from Mario Party 7. There is also "Triangle Twisters", a new game in which the player twist triangles to create a given shape. This game is unlocked after completing story mode.

Plot
The story begins with 5 Sky Crystals falling to the ground. Mario finds one of them and then shows it to all of his friends. However, Kamek flies past dropping party invitations from Bowser, inviting everyone to a feast in his castle to apologize for his villainy. They are suspicious at first, but they go to Bowser's castle, only to find that it is a trap and Bowser steals Mario's Sky Crystal. Using his new Minimizer, he shrinks everyone down to minuscule size. Bowser wants to find the four other Sky Crystals without Mario and his crew in the way and orders Kamek to fling them far away. Mario and his friends find themselves tiny in a very big world.

The crew travels to Bowser's Castle, far away while defeating a Piranha Plant in Wiggler's garden, stopping a Hammer Bro. from ruining Toadette's instruments in her music shop, helping Diddy Kong free DK after being turned to stone by a Dry Bones on the way to the feast at Bowser's castle, and freeing a Koopa's grandpa who has been trapped in a book by Kamek. Each of them gives a Sky Crystal to thank Mario and his crew. Once the friends make it to the castle, Bowser traps everyone inside his pinball machine and prepares once again to use his Minimizer. Luckily, DK and Diddy received the invitation too, and have made it to the castle in time. While looking for the food, DK bumps into Bowser and breaks the Minimizer in half, returning Mario and friends to their rightful size. However, Bowser reveals his new Megamorph Belt and challenges the superstar. After defeating Bowser, the crew takes back the stolen Sky Crystal and puts it with the others. The crystals combine into a new game (Triangle Twisters) and Bowser is meaner now because the crystals were part of a castle legend, but in a surprising move, Mario and crew invite Bowser and Bowser Jr. to play with them. They accept, and now everyone is happy, including DK and Diddy, who have eaten the entire buffet.

Reception

Mario Party DS received "average" reviews according to the review aggregation website Metacritic. In Japan, Famitsu gave it a score of two nines, one eight, and one seven for a total of 33 out of 40.

The game had strong sales the first week of its release in Japan, selling 234,708 copies. As of July 9, 2008, the game has sold 1,730,191 copies in Japan, according to Famitsu. It was the 18th best-selling game of Japan in 2008. By March 2011, the game had sold over eight million copies worldwide.

References

External links
 
 

2007 video games
Hudson Soft games
Mario Party
Multiplayer and single-player video games
Nintendo DS games
Nintendo DS-only games
Party video games
Video games about size change
Video games developed in Japan
Virtual Console games for Wii U